The statue of John Wesley, St Paul's Churchyard is an outdoor bronze sculpture depicting the theologian, cleric and co-founder of the religious movement known as Methodism, John Wesley. The statue is located northwest corner of St Paul's Churchyard, London, England, and was erected in 1988. It was cast from a sculpture created by Samuel Manning and his son between 1825 and 1849.

From 24 to 26 May 1738, Wesley worshipped in the nearby Chancel of the Cathedral. The statue is 5 foot 1 inches high, Wesley's height in life, and depicts him wearing a cassock and holding a bible in his left hand. An inscription on the front of the plinth reads:

On the rear of the plinth is a plaque reading 'Property of Aldersgate Trustees of the Methodist Church – 17 September 1988'.

Samuel Manning's original sculpture was in plaster and was exhibited at the Royal Academy in 1825. After Manning the Elder's death, his son recreated the sculpture in marble, and it is now situated in the Methodist Central Hall, Westminster.

See also
 List of public art in the City of London

References

External links
 

1988 establishments in England
1988 sculptures
Bronze sculptures in the United Kingdom
Monuments and memorials in London
Outdoor sculptures in London
Wesley, John
Statues in London
City of London